Jawab may refer to:

 Jawab (1942 film), an Indian Hindi-language film directed by P. C. Barua
 Jawab (1970 film), an Indian Hindi-language film directed by Ramanna
 Jawab (1995 film), an Indian Hindi-language film directed by Ajay Kashyap
 Jawab, a building on the Riverfront Terrace of the Taj Mahal

See also
 Jawaab, a Hindi film of 1985